Butyn is a rural locality (a hamlet) in Odintsovsky District, Moscow Oblast, Russia. Population: 

The hamlet is in the west of the town Golitsyno, Moscow Oblast. The town formerly had 'scribbled over' sections in satellite imagery used for Google Maps.

Notable people
 Alexei Navalny

References 

Rural localities in Moscow Oblast